The Versailles declaration is a document issued on  by leaders of the European Union (EU) in response to the 2022 Russian invasion of Ukraine that had begun two weeks earlier.  The document reaffirmed the EU's support for Ukraine, and outlined the union's plans for "bolstering defence capabilities, reducing energy dependencies and building a more robust economic base".

References 

2022 in the European Union
Declarations of the European Union
Military history of the European Union
Reactions to the 2022 Russian invasion of Ukraine